Alejo Menchon (born October 10, 1982) is an Argentine football player.

References

1982 births
Living people
Argentine footballers
J1 League players
Avispa Fukuoka players
Grupo Universitario de Tandil players
Association football midfielders
Footballers from Buenos Aires